Associazione Sportiva Dilettantistica Calcio Ivrea commonly referred to as A.S.D. Calcio Ivrea or simply Ivrea is an Italian association football club, based in Ivrea, Piedmont that plays in the regional Eccellenza.

The club founded in 1901 as U.S. Ivrea Calcio was refounded in 2010, after its dissolution the previous year, as A.S.D. Montalto Ivrea after that U.S.D. Montaltese has transferred the seat from Montalto Dora to this town. In 2012 the club was renamed with the current name.

History

U.S. Ivrea Calcio

Unione Sportiva Ivrea Calcio was founded in 1901, with its Football Division founded in 1918.

Seasons from 2005–06 to 2008–09

U.S. Ivrea Calcio played 2005–2006 in Serie C2/A, and won the promotion play-offs beating A.C. Carpenedolo in the finals, being therefore promoted to Serie C1, but promptly relegated after having lost the relegation play-out the next season.

In the summer 2009, the club failed, to register in Lega Pro Seconda Divisione and disbanded.

From A.S.D. Montalto Ivrea to A.S.D. Calcio Ivrea

A.S.D. Montalto Ivrea

In the summer 2010 U.S.D. Montaltese, after the 9th place in 2009–10 Promozione Piedmont and Aosta Valley group B, has transferred its seat from Montalto Dora to Ivrea and was renamed A.S.D. Montalto Ivrea, after the dissolution of the historical U.S. Ivrea Calcio the previous year.

In the season 2010–11 it plays always in Promozione Piedmont and Aosta Valley group B ranking 2nd in the league and 3rd in the subsequent playoffs.

In the season 2011–12 it was promoted to Eccellenza after winning the group B of Promozione Piedmont and Aosta Valley group B, also conquering the regional Scudetto of Promozione.

A.S.D. Calcio Ivrea

In the summer 2012 the club that plays in Eccellenza Piedmont and Aosta Valley group A was renamed A.S.D. Calcio Ivrea, thus becoming the new Ivrea.

Colors and badge
The team's color is orange.

References

External links
Regional Football Site
Piedmont Football Site
Local Sports Site

 
Football clubs in Piedmont and Aosta Valley
A.S.D. Calcio Ivrea
A.S.D. Calcio Ivrea
Serie C clubs
Association football clubs established in 1901
1901 establishments in Italy